Adriana Nieto (born Adriana Nieto Villanueva on March 13, 1978) is a Mexican actress.

Filmography

References

External links

1978 births
Living people
Mexican telenovela actresses
Mexican television actresses
Mexican stage actresses
Actresses from Mexico City
People from Mexico City